Yusof Kandi or Yusef Kandi may refer to:
 Yusef Kandi, Ardabil
 Yusof Kandi, Chaypareh, West Azerbaijan Province
 Yusef Kandi, Mahabad, West Azerbaijan Province
 Yusef Kandi, Shahin Dezh, West Azerbaijan Province